Murchadh (or Muircheartach) Riabhach Ó Cuindlis was an Irish scribe of the Ó Cuindlis family of brehons and scholars.

He was said to be a native of Bally Lough Deacker in what is now the extreme south of County Galway. Ó Cuindlis was one of the scribes of the Book of Lecan under the guidance of Giolla Íosa Mor mac Donnchadh MacFhirbhisigh; and later a scribe of An Leabhar Breac at Duniry.

See also

 Domnall Ó Cuindlis (d. 1342), Irish historian

References

Oxford Concise Companion to Irish Literature, Robert Welsh, 1996. 

15th-century Irish historians
14th-century births
15th-century deaths
Irish chroniclers
14th-century Irish historians
Irish scribes
People from County Galway
Medieval European scribes
Irish-language writers